Mount Zion Baptist Church or Mt. Zion Missionary Baptist Church or variations may refer to:

United States 
(by state)
 Mount Zion Baptist Church (Anniston, Alabama), listed on the NRHP in Alabama
 Mount Zion Baptist Church (Arlington, Virginia)
 Mount Zion Baptist Church (Brinkley, Arkansas), listed on the NRHP in Arkansas
 Mount Zion Missionary Baptist Church (Brinkley, Arkansas), listed on the NRHP in Arkansas
 Mt. Zion Missionary Baptist Church (Enola, Arkansas), listed on the NRHP in Arkansas
 Mount Zion Baptist Church (Little Rock, Arkansas), listed on the NRHP in Arkansas
 Mount Zion Baptist Church (Miami, Florida), listed on the NRHP in Florida
 Mount Zion Missionary Baptist Church (Pensacola, Florida), listed on the NRHP in Florida
 Mount Zion Baptist Church (Albany, Georgia), listed on the NRHP in Georgia
 Mt. Zion Baptist Church (Canton, Mississippi), listed on the NRHP in Mississippi
 Mount Zion Baptist Church (Salisbury, North Carolina), listed on the NRHP in North Carolina
 Mt. Zion Baptist Church, Winston-Salem, North Carolina
 Mount Zion Baptist Church (Athens, Ohio), listed on the NRHP in Ohio
 Mount Zion Baptist Church (Tulsa), Oklahoma
 Mount Zion Missionary Baptist Church (Fayetteville, Tennessee), listed on the NRHP in Tennessee
 Mount Zion Baptist Church (Nashville, Tennessee), listed on the NRHP in Tennessee
 Mount Zion First Baptist Church, in San Antonio, Texas
 Mount Zion Old School Baptist Church-VDHR 53-339, Aldie, VA, listed on the NRHP in Virginia
 Mount Zion Baptist Church (Charlottesville, Virginia), listed on the NRHP in Virginia
 First Mount Zion Baptist Church, Newark, New Jersey
 Sixth Mount Zion Baptist Church, Richmond, VA, listed on the NRHP in Virginia
 Mount Zion Baptist Church (Seattle, Washington), listed on the NRHP in Washington state
 Mount Zion Baptist Church (Martinsburg, West Virginia), listed on the NRHP in West Virginia
 Mount Zion Baptist Church (Wood County, West Virginia)

See also
 Mount Zion Church (disambiguation)
 Zion Baptist Church (disambiguation)